Özlüce can refer to the following places in Turkey:

 Özlüce, Büyükorhan
 Özlüce, Çubuk
 Özlüce, İnegöl
 Özlüce, İspir
 Özlüce, Kale
 Özlüce, Karakoçan
 Özlüce, Tarsus
 Özlüce Dam